The 2009 Northern Hemisphere tropical cyclone season may refer to:
2009 Atlantic hurricane season
2009 Pacific hurricane season
2009 Pacific typhoon season
2009 North Indian Ocean cyclone season